Doubtful Lake is located in North Cascades National Park, in the U. S. state of Washington. Doubtful Lake can be accessed on foot by way of Cascade Pass and following the Sahale Arm Trail to another side trail which leads to the lake. A designated backcountry camping zone is located at the lake.

References

External links

Lakes of Washington (state)
North Cascades National Park
Lakes of Chelan County, Washington